Eclair, formerly Laboratoires Eclair, was a film production, film laboratory, and movie camera manufacturing company established in Épinay-sur-Seine, France by Charles Jourjon in 1907. What remains of the business is a unit of Ymagis Group offering creative and distribution services for the motion pictures industries across Europe and North America such as editing, color grading, restoration, digital and theatrical delivery, versioning.

The company produced many silent shorts in France starting in 1908, and soon thereafter in America. The American division produced films from 1911-1914 such as Robin Hood, one of the first filmed versions of the classic story in 1912. 

Deutsche Eclair, now Decla Film, was established as its German studio branch. In 1909, Eclair took part in the Paris Film Congress, an attempt by major European producers to form a cartel similar to the MPPC in America.

Originally a production company, Eclair started building cameras in 1912. The company is made up of two entities: Eclair Cinema and Eclair Media.

Studios in the United States
An Eclair studio, the Eclair Moving Picture Company, was established in Fort Lee, New Jersey. It suffered a devastating fire in 1914 in which many early film prints were lost. A western studio set was also established in Tucson, Arizona. Jules Brulatour was involved with the company and Dorothy Gibson one of its stars.

Eclair films made in Tucson
 Over the Cliffs, 1913 
 The Reformation of Calliope, 1913 
 The Aztec Treasure, 1914
 Mesquite Pete's Fortune, 1914
 At the Crucial Moment, 1914
 The Renunciation, 1914
 The Jackpot Club, 1914
 The Return, 1914
 The Cross in the Cacti, 1914
 The Dupe, 1914
 The Caballero's Way, 1914
 When Death Rode the Engine, 1914
 The Heart of Carita, 1914
 The Squatter, 1914
 Dead Men's Tales, 1914
 Within an Inch of His Life, 1914
 The Stirrup Brother; or, The Higher Abdication, 1914
 The Blunderer's Mark, 1914
 A Tale of the Desert, 1914
 The Bar Cross Liar, 1914
 The Ghost of the Mine, 1914
 Into the Foothills, 1914
 Fate's Finger, 1914
 Smallpox on the Circle U, 1914
 The Line Rider, 1914
 Till the Sands of the Desert Grow Cold, 1914
 Whom God Hath Joined, 1914
 The Girl Stage Driver, 1914
 The Jewel of Allah, 1914
 The Wondrous Melody, 1914
 The Price Paid, 1914
 The Yellow Streak, 1914
 The Devil Fox of the Orth, 1914
 The First Nugget, 1914 
 The Bar Crossed Lier, 1914
 The Blunderer's Mark, 1914 
 Terror, 1915
 The Thief and the Chief, 1915
 Saved by Telephone, 1915
 Romance in Bear Creek, 1915
 The Oath of Smoky Joe, 1915
 The Answer, 1915
 Lure of the West, 1915
 The Lone Game, 1915

The Zigomar Lawsuit
Between 1911 and 1913, Eclair released a series of films revolving around the fictional character Zigomar which was created in 1909 by the French author Léon Sazie in the Paris-based newspaper Le Matin. The movies would go on to be very successful commercially, but Sazie came to feel that they were too different from his idea for the series, and so sued the director, Victorin-Hippolyte Jasset, and the Eclair company for excessive alteration of the source material. The courts ruled that 6,000 francs were to be paid to Sazie in damages, but Eclair appealed the case resulting in the amount to be paid increasing to 10,000 francs, with an additional 250 francs for any future violations.

Cameras
Among their early models was the Caméréclair of 1928, then the Camé 300 Réflex, both successful studio cameras.  Their real breakthrough design, the Caméflex (shoulder-held portable 35mm camera with instant-change magazines, with later 16/35mm dual format option) introduced in 1947, played a major part in the French New Wave by allowing for a freer form of shooting 35mm fiction films.

Later 16mm silent models such as the 1960 Eclair NPR (aka "Eclair 16" or "Eclair Coutant") and the 1971 Eclair ACL were documentary cinema favorites. The NPR also saw considerable use in television production and was the standard camera used by 16mm film crews in the BBC's Film Department. Due to its light weight and ergonomic design, which housed the film spools at the back of the camera rather than on top, the NPR was seen as a considerable improvement over its predecessors. For 16mm cameramen out in the field, this ease of use and maneuverability was vital to capture the right shot, often in hostile conditions.   NPR stands for Noiseless Portable Reflex and ACL comes from the  letters of the names of its designers Agusti (Austin) Coma and Jacques Lecoeur. The last models designed by Eclair in the early-1980s came too late to save the company from bankruptcy and were hardly produced, if at all : the  Eclair EX16 (similar to ACL with fixed viewfinder and 24/25fps fixed motor) and the Eclair PANORAM (first dual format 16+Super16 camera with "Varigate" system)

The instant clip-on design of the camera magazine of the Caméflex and later the NPR, ACL, EX16 and PANORAM models' coaxial pre-threaded loop magazines revolutionized filmmaking, in particular documentary films, since magazine changes could now be made in seconds without the need to spend time threading the film through the camera. The ACL model used a focal plane shutter for exposure and a side-to-side oscillating mirror for reflex viewing to keep the camera body size to a minimum

Famous camera users
Jean-Luc Godard used an Eclair Cameflex when filming Breathless in 1959. Godard wished to film using ambient light, and the Cameflex was the only motion picture camera capable of using ASA 400 35 mm Ilford HPS still camera film. Cinematographer Raoul Coutard spliced the 18-meter still camera rolls into 120-meter rolls for use as motion picture film, and pushed it to ASA 800 during development. A handheld Eclair camera was used in the shower scene in the 1960 film Psycho.

An Eclair 16 was used by L.M. Kit Carson (and discussed, on camera) in Jim McBride's ground-breaking film, David Holzman's Diary (1967). Two years later, the NPR was chosen by director Michael Wadleigh to shoot his documentary Woodstock. Wadleigh used sixteen NPR cameras. In Woodstock: From Festival to Feature, he explained some of the challenges he faced using a then seven-year-old camera in a manner that would have been unheard of for 35mm movie cameras, let alone the relatively untried NPR.

Later company history
The company was acquired in late 1968 by UK-based Canadian film producer Harry Saltzman who then founded the Éclair-Debrie (UK) Ltd. company and moved production to the United Kingdom. Meanwhile, Soremec-Cehess took over the French side of the company and resumed production in France, so English Eclair cameras (similar to the French product with minor differences) were manufactured simultaneously for a few years until Éclair-Debrie (UK) Ltd ceased activities in 1973. Production then continued in France with a good degree of success, but the company eventually declined in the late-1970s and early-1980s until it was eventually sold to Aaton S.A. in 1986 who ceased all camera production, offering only a license for maintenance of the many existing cameras.

The film processing and post-production side of Éclair continues to operate.

References

External links
eclair ACL manuals

Cinematography
Photography companies of France
Silent film studios
French companies established in 1907
Mass media companies established in 1907